Ruellia eurycodon is a plant native to the Cerrado vegetation of Brazil.

eurycodon
Flora of Brazil